Shane Lee Lindstrom (born February 11, 1994), known professionally as Murda Beatz, is a Canadian record producer. He has produced hit singles like "Butterfly Effect" by Travis Scott, "Back on Road" by Gucci Mane, "Nice for What" by Drake, "Motorsport" by Migos, and "Fefe", which was a collaboration between Murda, 6ix9ine, and Nicki Minaj.

In 2019, he released a single "Shopping Spree" featuring Lil Pump and Sheck Wes.

Early life and career
Lindstrom was raised in Fort Erie, Ontario, near Buffalo in a musical household and played drums as a child. He began producing beats at age 17 when he was still in high school using FL Studio after leaving his drumset at friend Pluto Hann's house. He chose his stage name "Murda Beatz" to promote his music on YouTube. When he turned 18, he moved to Chicago, and later worked with Chief Keef and Lil Durk. Lindstrom stated that he met most of his early artists through social media and mutual friends. Eventually, he connected with Atlanta rap group Migos and moved in with them to start producing their music.

Murda Beatz is notable for being a lead or featured artist on some tracks he produces, similarly to DJ Khaled, Mustard, or Mike Will Made It. He made the decision to transition to a "producer-artist," as Billboard describes it, in order to have more control and release music on his own timeline, instead of being dependent on the artists in the song. He released his first mixtape, Keep God First, in December 2016. He opened for G-Eazy's tour in the summer of 2018. His first single as a lead artist, "Shopping Spree," was released in 2019 with Lil Pump and Sheck Wes. He released his second single called "Banana Split," which features YNW Melly and Lil Durk, in March 2020. He plans to release his debut album by the end of 2020. In March, he confirmed the title to be Murda She Wrote with an initial release date of June 2020.

In 2019, Beatz created his own record imprint called Murda Beatz Recordings and signed artist Adam Halliday.

In 2021, Beatz was honored in the Forbes 30 Under 30 listing under the music category.

Personal life

By the time of June 2022, Murda Beatz started dating the Brazilian singer Anitta, but they broke up 2 months later.

Discography

Mixtapes

Production discography

Singles produced

|Kris Wu November Rain

Other charted songs

Production credits

2014

Migos - No Label 2
 02. "Copy Me"
 06. "Antidote" 
 17. "Body Parts" (featuring Machine Gun Kelly)
 19. "Emmitt Smith"

Lil Durk - Signed to the Streets 2
 02. "Ten Four"
 13. "Gas & Mud"

Migos - Rich Nigga Timeline
 03. "Can't Believe It"
 11. "Story I Tell"

2015

Migos - Yung Rich Nation
 04. "Spray the Champagne" 
 08. "Just for Tonight" (featuring Chris Brown)
 09. "Pipe it Up"
 11. "Playa Playa"
 12. "Cocaina" (featuring Young Thug)

Migos - Back to the Bando
 05. "Rich Nigga Trappin"

Freddie Gibbs - Shadow of a Doubt
 07. "Mexico" (featuring Tory Lanez) 

Jeremih - Late Nights
 09. "I Did" (featuring Feather)

2016

Migos - YRN 2
 11. "Hoe On A Mission"
 13. "Hate It Or Love It"

Drake - Views
 08. "With You" (featuring PartyNextDoor) (background vocals from Jeremih) 

Roy Woods - Waking at Dawn
 06. "Switch" 
 08. "Why"

Travis Scott - Birds in the Trap Sing McKnight
 07. "Sweet Sweet" 
 08. "Outside" (featuring 21 Savage) 

24hrs - 12:AM
 01. "Gucci Flame / 12:AM in the 6
 02. "Twenty Revenge" (featuring Yo Gotti) 
 03. "Monster Truck" 
 04. "Jungle Gym"

Kid Ink - RSS2
 02. "Before the Checks" (featuring Casey Veggies) 
 07. "Die in It" 

PartyNextDoor and Jeremih
 01. "Like Dat" (featuring Lil Wayne) 

Quavo
 00. "Cuffed Up" (featuring PartyNextDoor)
 00. "My Pockets"

PartyNextDoor
 00. "Buzzin" (featuring Lil Yachty) 
 00. "Can't Let The Summer Pass"

Rick Ross
 00. "No U-Turns" 

Meek Mill - DC4
 09. "Offended" 

O.T. Genasis - Coke N Butter
 04. "Feelings" 

Murda Beatz - Keep God First
 01. "Intro"
 02. "M&Ms" (featuring Offset and Blac Youngsta)
 03. "Scorin'" (featuring Playboi Carti and Offset)
 04. "More" (featuring PartyNextDoor and Quavo) 
 05. "Yacht Master" (featuring Swae Lee and 2 Chainz)
 06. "Novacane" 
 07. "She The Truth" (featuring Jeremih and Quavo) 
 08. "Drop Out" (featuring Jimmy Prime)
 09. "Growth" (featuring Offset)
 10. "Cappin' N Shit" (featuring Skooly and 2 Chainz)
 11. "Brown Money" (featuring Jay Whiss) 
 12. "9 Times Out of 10" (featuring Ty Dolla Sign) 
 13. "Pop Off" (featuring Offset)
 14. "Hunnids" (featuring Smoke Dawg)
 15. "I Just" (featuring Quavo)
 16. "Roller Coasters" (featuring 24hrs) 

Young Thug
 00. "I Might" (featuring 21 Savage) 

Gucci Mane - The Return of East Atlanta Santa
 08. "Yet"

2017

PnB Rock - GTTM: Goin Thru the Motions
 14. "Stand Back" (featuring A Boogie wit da Hoodie)

Migos - Culture
 05. "Get Right Witcha" 

Wifisfuneral - When Hell Falls
 05. "Hunnits, Fifties" (featuring Yung Bans) 

Various Artists – The Fate of the Furious: The Album
 02. "Go Off" (performed by Lil Uzi Vert, Quavo and Travis Scott) 

Drake – More Life
 02. "No Long Talk" (featuring Giggs) 
 11. "Portland" (featuring Travis Scott and Quavo) 

Kid Ink – 7 Series
 01. "Supersoaka" 

Meek Mill - Meekend Music
 02. "Backboard" (featuring Young Thug) 

Juicy J - Gas Face
 09. "Leanin" (featuring Chris Brown and Quavo) 

French Montana - Jungle Rules
 11. "Push Up" 

Tyga - BitchImTheShit2
 07. "Bel Air" (featuring Quavo) 

Aminé - Good for You
 02. "Yellow" (featuring Nelly) 

Bebe Rexha - All Your Fault: Pt. 2
 01. "That's It" (featuring Gucci Mane and 2 Chainz) 

Mozzy - "1 Up Top Ahk"
 10. "Outside" (featuring Lil Durk, Dave East and Lex Aura)

Quentin Miller
 00. "Unexplained Freestyle"

A Boogie wit da Hoodie - The Bigger Artist
 02. "Undefeated" (featuring 21 Savage) 

Gucci Mane - Mr. Davis
 01. "Work in Progress (Intro)" 

Yo Gotti - I Still Am
 09. "One on One"  (background vocals from Desiigner)
 11. "Yellow Tape"  

Roy Woods - Say Less
 04. "Take Time" (featuring 24hrs) 

Juicy J - Rubba Band Business
 07. "Too Many" 

G-Eazy - The Beautiful & Damned
 11. "Gotdamn" 

Travis Scott and Quavo – Huncho Jack, Jack Huncho
 03. "Eye 2 Eye" (featuring Takeoff) 
 05. "Huncho Jack" 
 06. "Saint" (produced with Illmind)

2018
Prime Boys – Koba World
 03. "Come Wit It" 
 04. "Street Dreams"
 05. "Tinted"
 06. "So What"
 09. "Hold Me Down"

Migos – Culture II
 11. "Gang Gang" 
 15. "Beast"
 17. "Motorsport" (featuring Cardi B and Nicki Minaj) 

Nipsey Hussle – Victory Lap
 11. "Grinding All My Life" 

Cardi B - Invasion of Privacy
 13. "I Do" (featuring SZA) 

Smokepurpp and Murda Beatz – Bless Yo Trap
 01. "123" 
 02. "Big Dope" 
 03. "Do Not Disturb" (featuring Lil Yachty and Offset) 
 04. "Pockets" 
 05. "Good Habits"
 06. "Mayo" 
 07. "Pray" (featuring ASAP Ferg)
 08. "Bumblebee" 
 09. "Ways" 
 10. "For the Gang" 

Nicki Minaj - Queen
 17. "Miami"

6ix9ine – Dummy Boy

 02. "Fefe" featuring Nicki Minaj & Murda Beatz
 05. "Mama" featuring Nicki Minaj and Kanye West

Trippie Redd - Life's a Trip
 05. "Forever Ever" (featuring Young Thug and Reese Laflare) 

Kris Wu – Antares
 02. "November Rain"

Drake
 Drake - "Nice for What"

2020 
Ariana Grande – Positions
 03. "Motive" 
Smoke Dawg — Struggle Before Glory
 03. "Three of a Kind (ft. Jay Critch, Fredo)"
 06. "Snow"
 07. "No Discussion (ft. AJ Tracey)"
 08. "These Games (ft. Jay Whiss, Safe)"
Lay Zhang – LIT
 02. "玉 (Jade)"

2021 
Ariana Grande – Positions (Deluxe)
 16. "Test Drive"

BamBam – Ribbon
 01. "Intro"
 05. "Air'"

Chlöe – TBA
01. "Have Mercy"

2022 
Murda Beatz feat. Blxst & Wale - "One Shot"

Notes

References

1994 births
Living people
Canadian people of Swedish descent
Canadian hip hop record producers
People from Fort Erie, Ontario
Canadian male songwriters
Trap musicians
Canadian DJs